Johann Nepomuk Felix Hradeczky (in older sources Ivan Nepomuk Hradec(z)ky; August 30, 1775 – July 6, 1846) was an Austrian politician.

Life

Hradeczky was born in Ljubljana (now Slovenia). He served as the mayor of Ljubljana from 1820 until his death. Hradeczky contributed significantly to the development of Ljubljana, and the poet France Prešeren dedicated a sonnet to him.

Legacy
Infrastructure in Ljubljana named after Hradeczky includes Hradeczky Street in the southeast part of the city and the Hradeczky Bridge across the Ljubljanica River.

Notes

References

1775 births
1846 deaths
Slovenian politicians
Mayors of Ljubljana